The 2017 Formula STCC Nordic season was the fifth season of the single seater championship that supports 2017 Scandinavian Touring Car Championship season. Previously it went under the name of Formula Renault 1.6 Nordic but the name was changed after Renault Sport dropped its support for the 3.5 and 1.6 classes in late 2015. The season began on 4 May at Ring Knutstorp and concluded on 16 September at Mantorp Park after seven rounds.

Drivers and teams

Race calendar and results
The season started on 4 May at Ring Knutstorp and finished on 16 September at Mantorp Park, with six of the seven scheduled double-header rounds supporting STCC. Rounds denoted with a blue background were part of the Formula STCC NEZ Championship.

Footnotes

Championship standings 
Points system
Points are awarded to the top 10 classified finishers. An extra point is awarded for pole position and fastest lap for each race.

Parallel to the main championship, two other championships are held: the Formula STCC Junior Svenskt Mästerskap (JSM) for drivers under 26 years old holding a Swedish driver license, and the Formula STCC Northern European Zone (NEZ) championship at selected rounds. Points to these championships are awarded using the same system, with the sole exception of pole position and fastest lap not awarding points.

Formula STCC Drivers' Championship

Formula STCC Junior Svenskt Mästerskap